John Morton may refer to:

Arts
John Morton (actor) (born 1947), American movie actor and stuntman
John Morton (composer) (born 1954), American composer
John Morton (trade unionist) (1925-2021), British trade unionist and musician
John Morton (writer), 1990s British writer and director on BBC
John D Morton (born 1953), American musician and visual artist
John Maddison Morton (1811–1891), English playwright
J. B. Morton (1893–1979), British humorist and columnist known as Beachcomber

Politics
Sir John Morton, 2nd Baronet (c. 1627–1699), English MP for Poole and Weymouth and Melcombe Regis
John Morton (15th century MP), English Member of Parliament for City of York
John Morton (American politician) (1725–1777), American surveyor, signed Declaration of Independence for Pennsylvania
John Morton (cardinal) (c. 1420–1500), Archbishop of Canterbury and Lord Chancellor of England
John Morton (MP) (c. 1716–1780), English Tory Member of Parliament
John Morton (Nova Scotia politician) (1781–1858), Canadian businessman and politician in Nova Scotia
John Elkanah Morton (1793–1835), Canadian political figure in Nova Scotia
John T. Morton (born 1966), American director of U.S. Immigration and Customs Enforcement
John W. Morton (Tennessee politician) (1842–1914), American Confederate veteran, farmer and politician

Sports
Jack Morton (John Joseph Morton, 1922–1983), American football player and coach in the National Football League
Jackie Morton (John Morton, 1914–1986), English footballer in the English Football League
John Morton (American football) (born 1969), American football coach in the National Football League
John Morton (basketball) (born 1967), American professional basketball player for the NBA Cleveland Cavaliers
John Morton (cricketer) (1895–1966), English cricketer
John Morton (racing driver) (born 1942), American racing driver
John Morton (skier) (born 1946), American Olympic skier
John W. Morton (athlete) (1879–1950), British athlete who competed at the 1908 Olympic Games
Johnnie Morton (born 1971), American professional football player in the National Football League

Other
John Morton (cognitive scientist) (born 1933), English neuroscientist
John Morton (naturalist) (1671–1726), English cleric and naturalist
John Morton (priest) (died 1722), English Anglican priest
John Morton (zoologist) (1924–2011), New Zealand biologist and theologian
John Chalmers Morton (1821–1888), British agriculturist and writer
John Percival Morton (1911–1985), English assistant undersecretary of state at the Ministry of Defence

See also
John Murton (disambiguation)